Prix Gaïa is an honorary award in watchmaking.

Since 1993, the Musée international d'horlogerie in La Chaux-de-Fonds presents this award for special achievements in watchmaking. It is awarded in three categories: "Artisanat création" (arts and creations), "Esprit d'entreprise" (entrepreneurship) und "Histoire" (history and research).

External links 

 https://prix-gaia.watchonista.com
 https://www.timeandwatches.com/2017/09/prix-gaia-2017.html
 https://journal.hautehorlogerie.org/en/prix-gaia-and-the-winners-are/

Former winners in the categories 
 1993 Jean-Claude Nicolet, Artisanat-creation, Henry Louis Belmont, Histoire-recherches, André Margot, Esprit d'entreprise
 1994 François-Paul Journe, Artisanat-creation, François Mercier, Histoire-recherches, Anton Bally, Esprit d'entreprise
 1995 Michel Parmigiani, Artisanat-creation, Ludwig Oechslin, Histoire-recherches, Antoine Simonin, Esprit d'entreprise
 1996 Vincent Calabrese, Artisanat-creation, Jean-Luc Mayaud, Histoire-recherches, Günter Blümlein, Esprit d'entreprise
 1997 Richard Daners, Artisanat-creation, Jean-Claude Sabrier, Histoire-recherches, Jean-Pierre Musy, Esprit d'entreprise
 1998 Philippe Dufour, Artisanat-creation, Yves Droz and Joseph Flores, Histoire-recherches, Luigi Macaluso, Esprit d'entreprise
 1999 Derek Pratt, Artisanat-creation, Estelle Fallet, Histoire-recherches, Gabriel Feuvrier, Esprit d'entreprise
 2000 René Bannwart, Artisanat-creation, Kathleen Pritschard, Histoire-recherches, Simone Bédat, Esprit d'entreprise
 2001 George Daniels, Artisanat-creation, Catherine Cardinal, Histoire-recherches, Rolf Schnyder, Esprit d'entreprise
 2003 Antony G. Randall, Artisanat-creation
 2004 André Beyner, Esprit d'entreprise
 2006 Luigi Pippa, Artisanat-creation, John H. Leopold, Histoire-recherches
 2007 Paul Gerber, Artisanat-creation
 2008 Nicolas G. Hayek, Esprit d'entreprise
 2009 Beat Haldimann, Artisanat-creation, Robert Greubel and Stephen Forsey, Esprit d'entreprise
 2010 Jacques Mueller and Elmar Mock, Artisanat-creation, Jean-Claude Biver, Esprit d'entreprise
 2011 François Junod, Artisanat-creation, Pierre-Yves Donzé, Histoire-recherches, Philippe Stern, Esprit d'entreprise
 2012 Eric Coudray, Artisanat-creation, Francesco Garufo, Histoire-recherches, Franco Cologni, Esprit d'entreprise
 2013 Andreas Strehler, Artisanat-creation, Günther Oestmann, Histoire-recherches, Ernst Thomke, Esprit d'entreprise
 2014 Kari Voutilainen, Artisanat-creation, Pierre Thomann, Histoire-recherches, Henri Dubois, Esprit d'entreprise
 2015 Anita Porchet, Artisanat-creation, Jonathan Betts, Histoire-recherches, Giulio Papi, Esprit d’entreprise
2016 Vianney Halter, Artisanat-creation, Giovanni Busca et Pascal Rochat, Esprit d'entreprise, Roger Smith, Histoire-recherche
2017 Jean-Marc Wiederrect, Artisanat-creation, Richard Mille, Esprit d'entreprise, Laurence Marti, Histoire-recherche 
2018 Paul Clementi, Artisanat-creation, Maximilian Büsser, Esprit d'entreprise, Reinhard Meis, Histoire-recherche 
2019 Suzanne Rohr, Artisanat-creation, Karl-Friedrich Scheufele, Esprit d'entreprise, Laurent Tissot, Histoire-recherche 
2020 Antoine Preziuso, Artisanat-creation, Felix Baumgartner et Martin Frei, Esprit d'entreprise, Denis Savois, Histoire-recherche
2021 Carole Kasapi, Artisanat-creation, Eric Klein, Esprit d'entreprise, Anthony Turner, Histoire-recherche 
2022 Laurent Barotte, Artisanat-creation, Edouard Meylan, Esprit d'entreprise, Nico de Rooij, Histoire-recherche

References 

Watchmakers (people)
Business and industry awards